Burgstein is the name of the following geographical objects:

Places:
 Burgstein, a parish in the district of Vogtlandkreis, Saxony, Germany
 Burgstein (Längenfeld), hamlet in the parish of Huben, municipality of Längenfeld, Tyrol, Austria
 Burgstein (Umhausen), hamlet in the parish of Tumpen, municipality of Umhausen, Tyrol, Austria

Rocks:
 Burgstein (Dollnstein) in the Altmühl valley
 Burgstein (Thuringia) in the Ilm valley